Estadio Olímpico Sección XXIV is a multi-use stadium in Salamanca, Guanajuato, Mexico.  It is currently used mostly for football matches and is the home stadium for Petroleros de Salamanca.  The stadium has a capacity 10,000 people and opened in 1951.

External links
Stadium information

Seccion XXIV
Sports venues in Guanajuato